The Synod of Twyford was a synod of the early English church held in 684 and described by Bede in his Historia ecclesiastica gentis Anglorum, Book IV, ch. 28. The synod was held at a place called "Adtwifyrdi", the location of which is unknown. Adtwifyrdi is the name used by the Venerable Bede to describe the meeting of river and tributary at the mouth of the River Aln.  Archbishop Theodore presided over the synod in the presence of King Ecgfrith; bishop Tunberht of Hexham was deposed there and Cuthbert elected bishop of Lindisfarne.

Notes

References
 

7th-century church councils
684
7th century in England
History of Northumberland